Comet is the ninth studio album by the American punk rock band The Bouncing Souls. It was released on June 12, 2012 by Rise Records in conjunction with Chunksaah Records, the band's own label. It was produced by Bill Stevenson and recorded at The Blasting Room. It debuted at number 110 on the Billboard 200 chart.

Track listing

Credits
The Bouncing Souls
Greg Attonito – vocals
Pete Steinkopf – guitar
Bryan Kienlen – bass
Michael McDermott – drums

Artwork
Bryan Kienlen – Artwork 
John J. Sass – Liner Notes 
Zak Kaplan – Layout, Photography

Production
Bill Stevenson – Producer, engineer
Jason Livermore – Mastering, engineer, mixing, producer 
Chris Beeble & Andrew Berlin – Engineers

References

The Bouncing Souls albums
2012 albums
Rise Records albums
Chunksaah Records albums
Albums produced by Bill Stevenson (musician)